Lophophelma luteipes is a moth of the family Geometridae first described by Felder and Rogenhofer in 1875. It is found in China, the north-eastern Himalayas and Sundaland. The habitat consists of montane areas.

Adults have white wings, very lightly striated and fasciated with black and brown.

Subspecies
Lophophelma luteipes luteipes
Lophophelma luteipes enthusiastes (Prout, 1927)

References

Moths described in 1875
Pseudoterpnini